Bihar is located in the eastern region of India, between latitudes 24°20'10"N and 27°31'15"N and longitudes 83°19'50"E and 88°17'40"E. It is an entirely land–locked state, in a subtropical region of the temperate zone. Bihar lies between the humid West Bengal in the east and the sub humid Uttar Pradesh in the west, which provides it with a transitional position in respect of climate, economy and culture. It is bounded by Nepal in the north and by Jharkhand in the south. Bihar plain is divided into two unequal halves (North Bihar and South Bihar) by the river Ganges which flows through the middle from west to east. Bihar's land has average elevation above sea level of 173 feet.

Physical and Structural Geography 

Bihar has three parts on the basis of physical and structural conditions: the Southern Plateau Region, Bihar's Gangetic Plain, and the Shivalik Region.  The Southern Plateau Region is located between Kaimur district in the West to Banka in the East. It is made up of hard rocks like gneiss, schist and granite. This region has many conical hills which are made up of batholim like Pretshil, Ramshila and Jethian hill. Bihar's Plain is located between the Southern Plateau and the Northern Mountains. It is bounded by the 150m contour line in the north as well as in the south. The vast stretch of fertile Bihar Plain is divided by the Ganges River into two unequal parts - North Bihar  and the South Bihar. Northern Bihar's Plain is located in East Champaran & West Champaran (Terai area with higher elevation), and plains of Samastipur, Begusarai, Saharsa and Katihar . Region is drained by Saryu, Gandak, Burhi Gandak, Bagmati, Kamla-Balan, Kosi and Mahananda and their tributaries. Southern Bihar's Plain is narrow than northern plain of Bihar and triangular in shape because many hills are located in this region such as hills of Gaya, Rajgir, Giriyak, Bihar Sharif, Sheikhpura, Jamalpur and Kharagpur hills. Third, Shivalik Region in sub-Himalayan foothills of Shivalik range's shadows the state from Northern part of West Champaran over an area 32 km long and 6–8 km wide. West Champaran district are clad in a belt of moist deciduous forest. As well as trees, this consists of scrub, grass and reeds.

Political geography 

The state is divided into 9 divisions , 38 districts, 101 subdivisions and 534 circles. 12 municipal corporations, 49 Nagar Parishads and 80 Nagar Panchayats for administrative purposes.

Geology
Bihar is in Indo-Gangetic plain so naturally fertile soil is one asset of the state. Thus Indo-Gangetic plain's soil is the backbone of agricultural and industrial development. The Indo-Gangetic plain in Bihar consists of a thick alluvial mantle of drift origin overlying in most part, the siwalik and older tertiary rocks. The soil is mainly little young loam rejuvenated every year by constant deposition of silt, clay and sand brought by streams but mainly by floods in Bihar

This soil is deficient in phosphoric acid, nitrogen and humus, but potash and lime are usually present in sufficient quantity. The most common soil in Bihar is Gangetic alluvium of Indo-Gangetic plain region, Piedmont Swamp Soil which is found in northwestern part of West Champaran district and Terai Soil which is found in eastern part of Bihar along the border of Nepal. clay soil, sand soil and loamy soil are common in Bihar.

Natural resources
Bihar is mainly a vast stretch of very fertile flat land. It is drained by the Ganges River, including northern tributaries of other river. The Bihar plain is divided into two unequal halves by the river Ganges which flows through the middle from west to east. Other Ganges tributaries are the Son, Budhi Gandak, Chandan, Orhani and Phalgu. The Himalayas begin at foothills a short distance inside Nepal but influence Bihar's landforms, climate, hydrology and culture. Central parts of Bihar have some small hills, for example the Rajgir hills. The Himalayan Mountains are to the north of Bihar, in Nepal. To the south is the Chota Nagpur plateau, which was part of Bihar until 2000 but now is part of a separate state called Jharkhand.

Forest

Bihar has notified forest area of 6,764.14 km2, which is 7.1 per cent of its geographical area. The sub Himalayan foothill of Someshwar and Dun ranges in Champaran district another belt of moist deciduous forests. These also consists of shrub, grass and reeds. Here the rainfall is above 1,600 mm and thus promotes luxuriant Sal forests in the favoured areas. The hot and dry summer gives the deciduous forests. The most important trees are Shorea Robusta (Sal), Shisham, Cedrela Toona, Khair, and Semal. This type of forests also occurs in Saharsa district and Purnia district.

Minerals
Bihar is a producer of Steatite (945 tonnes), Pyrites (9,539 tonnes/year), Quartzite (14,865 tonnes/year), Crude Mica (53 tonnes/year), Limestone (4,78,000 tonnes/year). Bihar has also some good resource of Bauxite in Jamui district, Cement Mortar in Bhabhua, dolomite in Bhabhua, Glass sand in Bhabhua, Mica in Muzaffarpur, Nawada, Jamui, Gaya and salt in Gaya and Jamui, Uranium and Beryllium are found in Gaya District,Coal in Rajmahal Coalfield, Gold In Jamui.

Water bodies

River 

 Ajay River
 Bagmati
 Budhi Gandak
 Bhutahi Balan
 Gandak
 Ganges
 Ghaghra
 Phalgu
 Gandaki River
 Kamala
 Karmanasha
 Koshi River
 Mahananda River
 Mohana
 Punpun
 Sapt Koshi
 Son River

Waterfall 

 Dhua Kund Falls
 Kakolat Waterfall
 Karkat Waterfall
 Madhuvdhandam Falls
 Manjhar Kund Waterfall
 North Tank Waterfall
 Telhar Waterfall

Spring (hydrosphere) 

 Manjhar Kund
 Dhua Kund
 Sita Kund
 Surya Kund
 Rishi Kund

Lake 

 Anupam Lake
 Kharagpur Lake
 Kanwar Lake Begusarai
 Ghora Katora Darbhanga
 Gogabil Lake Katihar
 Matsyagandha Lake

Pond 

 Mangal Talab
 Pandu Pokhar

Dams & reservoirs 

 Indrapuri Barrage

Hills and Caves

Hills 

 Barabar hills
 Brahmayoni hills Gaya Dist
 Brahmajuni Hills
 Bateshwar hills
 Dungeshwari hills
 Gridhakuta hills
 Gurpa hills
 Kavadol Hills/Kauvadol Hills
 Kaimur Range
 Mandar Hills
 Mundeshwari Hills
 Nagarjuni Hills
 Pretshila Hills
 Pragbodhi hills
 Ramshila Hills
 Rajgir hills
 Ramshila hills
 Vaibhar Hills

Caves 

 Barabar Caves
 Bateshwar cave
 Dungeshwari Cave
 Gopika Cave
 Indasala Caves
 Lomas Rishi Cave
 Mahakala caves
 Patalpuri Caves
Pippala cave
Saptaparni Cave
Sattaparnaguha Cave
 Son Bhandar Caves
 Sitamarhi Cave
 Vadathika Cave

Natural hazards

Flood

Bihar is India's most flood-prone state, with 76% of the population in the north Bihar living under the recurring threat of flood devastation. According to some historical data, 16.5% of the total flood affected area in India is located in Bihar while 22.1% of the flood affected population in India lives in Bihar. About  out of total geographical area of  comprising 73.06% is flood affected. Floods in Bihar are a recurring disaster which on an annual basis destroys thousands of human lives apart from livestock and assets worth millions.

Drought & Famine

Climate

Bihar has cool winters, the lowest temperatures being around 0–10 degrees Celsius (33 to 50 degrees Fahrenheit). Winter months are December and January. It is hot in the summer with average highs around 35–45 Celsius ( 95–105 Fahrenheit). April to mid June are the hot months. The monsoon months of June, July, August, and September see good rainfall. October & November and February & March have cool, pleasant climate.

See also

1934 Nepal–Bihar earthquake
Climate of Bihar
Floods in Bihar

References and footnotes